Gina Torrealva (born November 16, 1961) is a retired volleyball player from Peru. She finished 4th at the 1984 Summer Olympics and was a silver medalist at the 1988 Seoul Olympics. She was a member of the Peruvian team that won second place in the World Championship in 1982 and the third place in the World Championship in 1986.

References

External links
 
 

1961 births
Living people
Olympic volleyball players of Peru
Volleyball players at the 1980 Summer Olympics
Volleyball players at the 1984 Summer Olympics
Volleyball players at the 1988 Summer Olympics
Olympic silver medalists for Peru
Peruvian women's volleyball players
Olympic medalists in volleyball
Medalists at the 1988 Summer Olympics
Pan American Games medalists in volleyball
Pan American Games silver medalists for Peru
Pan American Games bronze medalists for Peru
Volleyball players at the 1979 Pan American Games
Volleyball players at the 1983 Pan American Games
Volleyball players at the 1987 Pan American Games
Medalists at the 1979 Pan American Games
Medalists at the 1983 Pan American Games
Medalists at the 1987 Pan American Games
20th-century Peruvian women
21st-century Peruvian women